17 Blocks is an 2019 American documentary film, directed by Davy Rothbart, written by Rothbart and Jennifer Tiexiera. The film revolves around the Sanford family, who spent 20 years filming themselves.

The film had its world premiere at the Tribeca Film Festival on April 27, 2019. It was released in virtual cinema on February 19, 2021, by MTV Documentary Films.

Synopsis
The film follows the Sanford family, who spent 20 years filming themselves, living just 20 minutes away from the White House.

Release
The film had its world premiere at the Tribeca Film Festival on April 27, 2019. The film also screened at AFI Docs on June 20, 2019. In July 2019, MTV Documentary Films acquired distribution rights to the film. The film was released in virtual cinema on February 19, 2021.

Reception
17 Blocks received positive reviews from film critics. On Metacritic, the film holds a rating of 79 out of 100, based on 6 critics, indicating "generally favorable reviews".

References

External links

2019 documentary films
American documentary films
Documentary films about families
MTV Films films
2010s English-language films
2010s American films